Robertson Island is a bar island in Marion County, West Virginia on the Tygart Valley River.

See also 
List of islands of West Virginia

References

River islands of West Virginia
Landforms of Marion County, West Virginia